Basil William Malcolm (14 July 1912 – 22 December 1995) was an English cricketer. He played two first-class matches for Bengal during their victorious 1938–39 Ranji Trophy season. He played in a single further first-class cricket match for a side raised by Homi Maneck Mehta for the Bombay Festival Tournament in 1946/47, when he played alongside Test players Dattu Phadkar and Khanderao Rangnekar.

See also
 List of Bengal cricketers

References

External links
 

1912 births
1995 deaths
English cricketers
Bengal cricketers
Sportspeople from Worthing